Belize competed in the 2014 Commonwealth Games in Glasgow, Scotland from July 23 to August 3, 2014. A team of 12 athletes competed in 5 sports. They were accompanied by 6 officials.

Athletics

Belize's athletics team consisted of 5 athletes.

Men

Field events

Women

Combined events – Heptathlon

Key
NR = National record

Cycling

Belize's cycling team consisted of four athletes.

Road
Men

Shooting

Belize's shooting team consisted of one athlete.

Men

Table tennis

Belize's table tennis team consisted of one athlete. This was the first time that Belize had competed in table tennis at the Commonwealth Games.

Singles

Triathlon

Belize's triathlon team consisted of one athlete. This was the first time that Belize had competed in the triathlon at the Commonwealth Games.

Men

References

Nations at the 2014 Commonwealth Games
Belize at the Commonwealth Games
2014 in Belizean sport